Perymenium is a genus of South American and Mesoamerican plants in the tribe Heliantheae within the family Asteraceae.

 Species

 formerly included
Several species were once considered members of Perymenium but are now regarded as better suited to other genera: Damnxanthodium Oteiza Steiractinia

References

Heliantheae
Asteraceae genera